Arriva Sapphire is a premium brand used by various Arriva bus subsidiaries in the United Kingdom.

History

In February 2013, Arriva UK Bus announced that it would launch a premium service under the Sapphire brand for its bus services in the United Kingdom. It is similar to the Stagecoach Gold brand launched by Stagecoach Group in 2007.

Arriva initially launched the Sapphire brand on four pilot routes:
Arriva Buses Wales' route 1 Wrexham to Chester
Arriva Midlands' route 31/31a Oadby to Leicester this route now uses any vehicles 
Arriva North East's route 7 Darlington to Durham
Arriva Shires & Essex's route 280 Aylesbury to Oxford

In 2014, the brand was extended to 11 more routes with another six scheduled for conversion in late 2015.

In 2017, Arriva Sapphire was rebranded with a new logo and livery, in line with the switchover to the new Arriva brand. In 2018, the Arriva Sapphire logo was updated again, to reflect the new brand.

In 2019, Arriva Midlands routes 1, 2, 2E running between Walsall and Cannock/Huntington were downgraded to regular buses after six years of Sapphire. Further routes across the country have since been withdrawn or removed from the Sapphire brand.

In 2022, Arriva started to phase out the Sapphire brand nationally, with the majority of buses being repainted into the standard Arriva livery or replaced with new buses.

Routes

As at November 2022, there were 32 Arriva Sapphire routes.

Former services

Vehicles
Buses have leather seats, free WiFi, power ports, and a modified two tone blue livery. The initial pilot routes commenced with a mix of refurbished double deck buses and new Wright Pulsar bodied VDL SB200s. Mostly since then, new buses have been purchased, primarily Alexander Dennis Enviro400s, Wright StreetLites and Wright StreetDecks. A number of Wright Pulsar/Pulsar 2 vehicles have been refurbished to operate Sapphire routes. In 2020 a selection of Optare Versas in Yorkshire were repainted into the new Arriva Sapphire livery.

See also
Arriva Max

References

External links

2013 establishments in the United Kingdom
Sapphire
Bus transport brands
Luxury brands